Geraldine Keams (born August 19, 1951) is an American actress. She is best known for her work in numerous television series, often playing a maternal role. She is a member of the Navajo Nation.

Biography
Keams was born on August 19, 1951 in Flagstaff, Arizona. She was raised on the Navajo reservation then went to the University of Arizona, where she studied drama and film.

After graduating from college, Keams moved to New York City to pursue theater. In New York, she wrote and performed with Hanay Geiogamah's (Kiowa/Delaware) Native American Theater Ensemble at La MaMa Experimental Theatre Club. She adapted a Navajo creation story for the 1972 production Na Haaz Zan and also performed in Geiogamah's Body Indian. The ensemble took both pieces on tour in 1972 and 1973, performing at the University of New Mexico, the College of Santa Fe, Haskell Indian Junior College, the Walker Art Center, the American Indian Center in Chicago, the Smithsonian Institution, Rough Rock Demonstration School in Chinle, Arizona, Springfield College, the University of Massachusetts Amherst, the University of Michigan, the University of Wisconsin - Milwaukee, Dartmouth College, and the University at Buffalo, among other places.

Keams made her film debut playing Little Moonlight in Clint Eastwood's western The Outlaw Josey Wales (1976).

In 2021, she had a recurring role in the Peacock sitcom Rutherford Falls, about relationships between a fictional Native American tribe and the New England town it borders. Showrunner Sierra Teller Ornelas described Keams as "Navajo royalty", saying, "When she walked on the set, I was starstruck".

In addition to her film work, Keams gives live performances and workshops. She is a resident artist at the Los Angeles Music Center. Keams currently resides in Pasadena, California.

Filmography

References

External links 
 Transcribed interview with Keams (1983)
 
 Geri Keams' website
 Keams' page on La MaMa Archives Digital Collections
 Keams on the National Museum of the American's Indian Film & Media Catalog

Native American actresses
American film actresses
1951 births
Living people
Actresses from Arizona
American stage actresses
Navajo people
20th-century Native Americans
21st-century Native Americans
20th-century Native American women
21st-century Native American women
Native American people from Arizona